Mount King is a  mountain summit located in Yoho National Park, in the Canadian Rockies of British Columbia, Canada. Its nearest higher peak is Mount Deville,  to the northwest. Both are in the Van Horne Range, which has the oldest mountains in the Rockies, and as such they are highly eroded.  Mount King is a landmark that can be seen from Highway 1, the Trans-Canada Highway in the Kicking Horse valley and Kicking Horse Pass areas. The mountain is situated 14 kilometres southwest of Emerald Lake, and 13 km southwest of Field, British Columbia.

History
The mountain was named by Otto Koltz in 1886 for William Frederick King (1854–1916), a Canadian surveyor, astronomer, and civil servant.

The first ascent of Mount King was made in 1892 by James J. McArthur.

The mountain's name was officially adopted in 1924 when approved by the Geographical Names Board of Canada.

Geology
Mount King is composed of sedimentary rock laid down during the Cambrian period. Formed in shallow seas, this sedimentary rock was pushed east and over the top of younger rock during the Laramide orogeny.

Climate
Based on the Köppen climate classification, Mount King is located in a subarctic climate zone with cold, snowy winters, and mild summers. Temperatures can drop below −20 °C with wind chill factors below −30 °C. Precipitation runoff from Mount King drains into tributaries of the Kicking Horse River which is a tributary of the Columbia River.

See also
 Geography of British Columbia

References

External links
 Parks Canada web site: Yoho National Park

Two-thousanders of British Columbia
Canadian Rockies
Mountains of Yoho National Park
Kootenay Land District